The 2018–19 Serie A2 season, known for sponsorship reasons as the Serie A2 Old Wild West, was the 45th season of the Italian basketball second league Serie A2 Basket. The season started on October 5, 2018, and ended on June 17, 2019, with the last game of the promotion playoffs finals.

Lavoropiù Fortitudo Bologna won their 1st title by beating Virtus Roma in the game 2 of the A2 Finals.

Rules
The season was composed of 32 teams with a regional subdivision in two equal groups of sixteen, East and West. Each team played twice each team in its subgroup, the second ranked team of each group then plays the 9th ranked team of the other group (e.g. East No. 2 against West No. 9), then the third best against the 8th, and so on, to form a promotion playoffs (for one place) of sixteen teams. Two more teams (1st ranked of each group) were promoted directly without going through the playoffs

Regular season

East Group league table

West Group league table

Coppa Italia
At the half of the league, the four first teams of each group in the table played the LNP Cup.

Bracket

Source: Serie A2

Playout
The league play-out was played between the 14th and 15th placed teams of each group in two elimination rounds. The series was played in a best-of-three format: the first, the second and the eventual fifth game were played at home of the team that got the better ranking at the end of the regular season, the third and the eventual fourth were played at home the lower ranked team.

Source: Serie A2

Playoffs
The league's playoffs were played between the second and the 9th of each group in four rounds: eightfinals, quarterfinals, semifinals and final. All series were played in a best-of-five format: the first, the second and the eventual fifth match were played at home of the best-placed team, the second, the third and the fourth, at the end of the regular season.

Source: Serie A2

Serie A2 Finals 
Since this season the Playoffs winner was the third promoted team to LBA. The two other promoted clubs, which were also the top seeded on the League Table at the end of the Regular Season, faced a final of two matches to decide the winner of the Serie A2.

Virtus Roma vs. Lavoropiù Fortitudo Bologna

Source: Serie A2

References

External links
Official website 

Serie A2 Basket seasons
2018–19 in Italian basketball
Italy